Daxing is a town under the administration of Yucheng District, Ya'an, Sichuan, China. , it has 14 villages under its administration.

See also 
 List of township-level divisions of Sichuan

References 

Towns in Sichuan
Ya'an